Martins Point is a small community in Nova Scotia, Canada.
It was founded hundreds of years ago.  There are various waterfronts down the many side roads of Martins Point. The two other communities surrounding Martins Point are Western Shore and Martins River. Some of the shops located there are The Whirlyjig Factory and the Sunflower Shop.  Martin's Point is also home to Bigfoot Systems Inc, manufacturers of plastic footing forms used with construction tubes.

References
  Martin's Point on Destination Nova Scotia

Communities in Lunenburg County, Nova Scotia
General Service Areas in Nova Scotia